Vytautas Juozapaitis (born 14 December 1963 in Radviliskis, Lithuania) is a Lithuanian singer (baritone), recipient of Lithuanian National Prize, a soloist of Lithuanian National Opera and Ballet Theatre and Kaunas State Musical Theatre, a professor of Lithuanian Academy of Music and Theatre and a docent of Vilnius College of Higher Education, and a television personality. He has performed in many international venues and is considered the most famous contemporary Lithuanian baritone.

Biography 
After graduating Lithuanian Academy of Music (in the class of Professor ) in 1989, Juozapaitis debuted in the role of Freddie in My Fair Lady and soon moved on to prominence, becoming one of the leading opera soloists of Lithuania.

He has been a soloist at the Lithuanian National Opera and Ballet Theatre since 1990 and at the Kaunas State Musical Theatre since 1989. He also collaborates with Klaipėda State Musical Theatre and appears in other subsidiary projects.

In 1992 and 1993, he studied at the European Center for Opera and Voice (ECOV) in Belgium, then with Marlena Malas in New York City, United States and baritone Tom Krause in Finland. He sang in Don Giovanni at the Czech National Opera Theatre in Prague, and toured with his company in Japan during 1994 and 1995, as well with company Teatro Lirico D'Europa in the US in 2003. In 2005 he worked in the Gran Teatre del Liceu in Barcelona, Spain, as the opera manager.

In addition to working as a performer, Juozapaitis has been teaching vocal performance since 1996 at his alma mater, now the Lithuanian Academy of Music and Theatre, and also at the Vilnius College from 2006. Among his graduate students are some prominent Lithuanian opera singers like tenor Edmundas Seilius and baritone Dainius Stumbras. In 2009, Juozapaitis opened his personal educational centre of culture and art called the Vytauto Juozapaičio kultūros ir meno centras.

He continues to perform in Lithuania and abroad; he has toured in Austria, the Netherlands, Belgium, Czech Republic, India, Nepal, Norway, Poland, United States, Spain, Russia, Germany, Latvia, Estonia, Finland and Canada. He has participated in many Lithuanian and foreign music festivals such as Savonlinna Opera Festival in Finland,  in Switzerland, the Beijing Music Festival in China, the Salzburg Festival in Austria, the International Festival of Oratorio and Cantata Music in Wrocław, Poland, the Montpellier Festival and the Haydn–Schubert Festival in Vilnius, and cooperated with Lithuanian and famous foreign conductors: Mstislav Rostropovich, Justus Franz, Pinchas Steinberg, Eduard Müller, David Agler, Christoph von Dohnanyi, Krzysztof Penderecki, and many others; directors – Anthony Minghella, Chen Shi-Zheng, Emilio Sagi, Francesca Zambello, Monika Wiesler, Silviu Purcarete, Jurij Aleksandrov, Jonas Jurašas, Gintaras Varnas, Dalia Ibelhauptaitė, Raimundas Banionis, Gintas Žilys and others.

Juozapaitis took first prize at the 1980 Dainų dainelė competition and in 1992 won the 1st prize in the Competition of Lithuanian Vocalists. In 1993, he was awarded a diploma at the International Luciano Pavarotti Vocal Competition in Philadelphia (where the chairman was Pavarotti himself). Later he won all the major prizes of Lithuanian theatre scene, including three Opera Soloist of the Year awards, 2 Public's Favorite, Kipras, Kristoforas, Auksinis scenos kryžius (The Golden Cross of Scene) and the Officer's Cross of the Order for Merits to Lithuania. In recognition of his achievements, he was awarded the Lithuanian National Prize for Culture and Arts in 2003.

Maestro Juozapaitis is also a well-known television personality: a TV host (of the classical music show Tegyvuoja klasika! ["Long live the classics!"]), a chairman of judges in 2 music competition shows—Žvaigzdžių duetai (an analogue to Celebrity Duets) and Triumfo arka ("Triumphal arch", a contest of opera singers)— and also one of its formers, on 2 major Lithuanian TV channels LTV and LNK. He has also released 3 successful solo CDs.

Married for the second time in 1988, has 3 daughters—Vaiva, Vaida (an adopted daughter from wife's first marriage) and Ieva.

Roles 

Lithuanian composers has written some roles specifically for V. Juozapaitis: Count Shemeta – in Broniaus Kutavičiaus opera Lokys, King Mindaugas – in Broniaus Kutavičiaus opera Ugnis ir tikėjimas, Žilvinas – in Audronė Žigaitytė opera Žilvinas ir Eglė and Žygimantas Augustas – in Giedrius Kuprevičius opera Karalienė Bona.

V. Juozapaitis' repertoire includes almost 50 major baritone roles in operas, operettas and musicals. Most famous of them:
 
Don Giovanni – in Wolfgang Amadeus Mozart opera Don Giovanni
Rigoletto – in Giuseppe Verdi opera Rigoletto
Figaro – in Gioachino Rossini opera The Barber of Seville
Escamilllo – in Georges Bizet opera Carmen
Germont, Barone Douphol – in Giuseppe Verdi opera La Traviata
Don Carlos, Marquis of Posa – in Giuseppe Verdi opera Don Carlos
Prince Ypsheim – in Johann Strauss operetta Wiener Blut
Sharpless – in Giacomo Puccini opera Madama Butterfly
Enrico – in Gaetano Donizetti opera Lucia di Lammermoor
Scarpia – in Giacomo Puccini opera Tosca
Gianni Schicchi – in Giacomo Puccini opera Gianni Schicchi
Amonasro – in Giuseppe Verdi opera Aida
Valentino – in Charles Gounod opera Faust
Prince Yeletsky – in Pyotr Tchaikovsky opera The Queen of Spades
Wolfram – in Richard Wagner opera Tannhäuser
Guglielmo – in Wolfgang Amadeus Mozart opera Così fan tutte
Renato – in Giuseppe Verdi opera Un ballo in maschera
Ping – in Giacomo Puccini opera Turandot
Don Carlo – in Giuseppe Verdi opera La forza del destino
Pilot – in Rachel Portman opera The Little Prince
Paganini – in Franz Lehár operetta Paganini
Freddie – in Frederick Loewe musical My Fair Lady
Homonay – in Johann Strauss operetta The Gypsy Baron
Don Alvaro – in Gioachino Rossini opera Il viaggio a Reims
Duke Guido – in Johann Strauss operetta Eine Nacht in Venedig
Plunkett – in Friedrich von Flotow opera Martha
Delaura – in Peter Eötvös opera Love and Other Demons
Frollo – in Richard Cocciante musical Notre Dame de Paris
Gérard – in Umberto Giordano opera Andrea Chénier
Arnoldo – in Amilcare Ponchielli opera I Lituani
Pontius Pilate – in Tim Rice and Andrew Lloyd Webber rock opera Jesus Christ Superstar
Count Almaviva – in Wolfgang Amadeus Mozart opera The Marriage of Figaro

V. Juozapaitis also has sung in many oratories including Carmina Burana by Carl Orff, Ein deutsches Requiem by Brahms, Stabat Mater by Franz Schubert, Era di Aguarius by Sofia Gubaidulina or War Requiem by Benjamin Britten.

Discography 

2004 – Negaliu Nemylėti (I Can't Help Falling In Love)
2005 – Baritonas (Baritone)
2008 – Neprarask Vilties (Don't Lose Hope)

References

External links
Vytauto Juozapaičio edukacinis kultūros ir meno centras – The official website

1963 births
20th-century Lithuanian male singers
Lithuanian opera singers
Operatic baritones
Living people
Recipients of the Lithuanian National Prize
Officer's Crosses of the Order for Merits to Lithuania
People from Radviliškis
Musicians from Vilnius
Academic staff of the Lithuanian Academy of Music and Theatre
Members of the Seimas
Lithuanian television personalities
20th-century male opera singers
21st-century male opera singers
21st-century Lithuanian politicians
21st-century Lithuanian male singers